Biketi Lake is a small lake in Samtskhe-Javakheti, southeastern Georgia. It is located north of Madatapa Lake.

References

Lakes of Georgia (country)
Geography of Samtskhe–Javakheti